The Restless Conscience: Resistance to Hitler Within Germany 1933–1945 is a 1992 American documentary film directed by Hava Kohav Beller. It was nominated for an Academy Award for Best Documentary Feature.

Reception
Miranda Seymour mentions the film in her book Noble Endeavours. She describes the revelations of this film and how they are featured as "fascinating".

Biography

References

External links
 

1992 films
American documentary films
Black-and-white documentary films
Films directed by Hava Kohav Beller
Documentary films about Nazi Germany
Films about the German Resistance
American black-and-white films
1990s English-language films
1992 documentary films
1990s American films